The 1972 USC Trojans football team represented the University of Southern California (USC) during the 1972 NCAA University Division football season. The Trojans won all 12 of their games and were consensus national champions.

Schedule

Roster

Rankings

Game summaries

at No. 4 Arkansas

    
    
    
    
    
    
    

Tailback Rod McNeill, who sat out the previous year with a hip injury, led the Trojans with 117 yards on 28 carries while Mike Rae, a backup for two seasons, completed 18 of 24 passes for 269 yards and in the second half completed nine straight passes at one point in his first start.

Oregon State

    
    
    
    
    
    
    
    
    

Anthony Davis 25 rushes, 206 yards

at Illinois

Michigan State

at No. 15 Stanford

California

No. 18 Washington

Oregon

    
    
    

On a very rainy and cold day, the Trojans were held to their lowest score of the season.

Washington State

at No. 14 UCLA

    
    
    
    
    

Anthony Davis 25 Rush, 178 Yds

No. 10 Notre Dame

vs. No. 3 Ohio State (Rose Bowl)

    
    
    
    
    
    
    
    
    

John McKay's 100th career victory
Anthony Davis 157 Rush Yds
Sam Cunningham set Rose Bowl scoring record (previous - 18 by three players)

NFL Draft
Ten Trojans were selected in the 1973 NFL Draft, with three in the first round.

List of USC Trojans in the NFL Draft

References

External links
 Game program: #1 USC vs. Washington State at Seattle – November 4, 1972

USC
USC Trojans football seasons
College football national champions
Pac-12 Conference football champion seasons
Rose Bowl champion seasons
College football undefeated seasons
USC Trojans football